Chris Abernathy is an American politician and electrician serving as a member of the Idaho House of Representatives from the 29th district, which includes a portion of Bannock County, Idaho.

Early life and education 
Born and raised in Pocatello, Idaho, Abernathy graduated from Highland High School. He attended Idaho State University before joining an apprentice program sponsored by the International Brotherhood of Electrical Workers.

Career 
For 24 years, Abernathy has worked as a electrician and union executive. A member of the Democratic Party, he assumed office in 2018 after defeating incumbent Republican Dustin Manwaring. In the 2020 election, Abernathy will face Manwaring in a rematch.

References 

Living people
Democratic Party members of the Idaho House of Representatives
People from Pocatello, Idaho
American electricians
International Brotherhood of Electrical Workers people
Year of birth missing (living people)
21st-century American politicians